The 2022 Formula Regional European Championship by Alpine was a multi-event, Formula Regional open-wheel single seater motor racing championship held across Europe. The championship featured a mix of professional and amateur drivers, competing in Formula Regional cars that conform to the FIA Formula Regional regulations for the championship. This was the fourth season of the championship and the second after a merger with Formula Renault Eurocup which resulted to the change of the engine supplier to Alpine. The season commenced on 22 April at Autodromo Nazionale Monza and concluded on 23 October at Mugello Circuit, after ten rounds.

Prema Racing won their third teams' championship at Barcelona, with two races to spare. Their driver Dino Beganovic won the drivers' championship, with one race to spare. Leonardo Fornaroli, driving for Trident, won the rookie title.

Teams and drivers 
Twelve teams were pre-selected on 12 November 2021; JD Motorsport's entry and assets were taken over by Trident. On 23 February 2022, new team Race Performance Motorsport was announced to have taken over DR Formula's entry.

 Belén García was scheduled to compete for G4 Racing on a part-time basis, but withdrew prior to the start of the season.
 Kirill Smal was scheduled to compete for KIC Motorsport, but withdrew prior to the start of the season as a result of the Russian invasion of Ukraine.

Race calendar 
The calendar was revealed on 25 October 2021.

Results

Season summary

First half 
The fourth season of the championship began in late April at Monza with Dino Beganovic on pole for the wet season opener. He kept the lead at the start, while Lorenzo Fluxá next to him dropped back behind Gabriele Minì and Michael Belov, before repassing the Russian. A collision in turn one resulted in the first safety car. On the restart, Belov got Fluxá back while Minì collided with Beganovic, destroying his front wing and with it his chances for a points finish. The top three remained unchanged for the rest of the race, untroubled by two further safety car periods. Paul Aron claimed pole for the second race, and led from the start ahead of Minì, who was overtaken by Beganovic at the start. Aron's lead remained steady, he mastered two safety cars, one mid-race and one close to the end. Beganovic kept close to Aron, but was not able to challenge the leader. Still, his second place together with his win the day before meant he took the championship lead, 15 points ahead of Belov. Sebastián Montoya led the rookie standings.

The championship stayed in Italy, visiting Imola next, where Minì won pole for race one. He kept the lead all throughout a disrupted race: first, the race was stopped for Sami Meguetounif, who crashed heavy and had to be taken to hospital. On the restart, Beganovic claimed second place from Mari Boya, while leader Minì was handed a ten-second time penalty for a false start. Two more safety cars and another red flag, this time for Axel Gnos, saw the race to its end, promoting Beganovic to the win and Aron to the podium. Minì bounced back the day after to take another pole position. A safety car start for damp conditions saw him control the start ahead of Tim Tramnitz in second, before the German was passed by Beganovic, and then by Kas Haverkort, who would later lose his podium to Gabriel Bortoleto after a penalty for a technical fault. A sudden thunderstorm caused a three-car crash and a red flag, and Minì controlled the restart to claim the win. Beganovic's championship advantage rose to 38 points from Aron.

Round three supported the prestigious Monaco Grand Prix, and one qualifying session was held, where Hadrien David and Beganovic claimed pole for the two races. David held the lead in race one, and there were little changes to the order before the red flag was thrown when the track was blocked by Esteban Masson at the Fairmont Hairpin. When the race restarted, passing remained tricky, so Beganovic could do nothing but follow David to the finish to grab his fifth top-two finish in a row. Haverkort came third, having held back Minì all race long. Race two saw the top pair reversed, with Beganovic leading David, before two separate crashes for Roman Bilinski and Macéo Capietto brought out the safety car. There were a few little fights with slight contact further down the field, but almost no passes were made, and the top trio of Beganovic, David and Minì held position until the finish. David's great weekend saw him grab second in the standings, but Beganovic's lead now stood at 55 points over the rest of the field.

A week later, Paul Ricard hosted the next round, and Beganovic started the first race on pole. He kept Bortoleto behind at the start, before Joshua Dufek crashed and caused a safety car. On the restart, Aron in third managed to pass Bortoleto. The Prema pair gapped the field fighting for the win, and eventually Aron was able to pass his teammate. On the last lap, Bortoleto in third had to relinquish his podium to Belov. Race two saw Minì on pole, surviving another first-lap safety car ahead of Beganovic, who had already passed Bortoleto. The lead group was close together all race, before another safety car neutralised the race, leaving a short dash to the finish. Beganovic pressured the leader, but was not able to make a move, so came second behind Minì and ahead of Haverkort. His run of now eight top-two finishes was brought to an end however, as his car was found to be non-compliant and he was excluded from race two. This initially gifted Aron a podium, but Beganovic's championship lead was still 45 points over Minì. Beganovic's team appealed the decision. After the team won its appeal in front of the Italian Federation's Court of Appeal in October, the Championship Promoter made a further appeal against the Italian Court's ruling, which was finally denied by the FIA International Court of Appeal. Beganovic was thus reinstated to second place. 

The first half of the season concluded at Zandvoort with Aron winning the first qualifying. He held David back at the start and kept a consistent gap to the Frenchman, before coming under attack in the latter stages of the race. Keith Donegan had an incident in turn two that resulted in a late safety car, but David was not able to make a move on the leader during the restart. Behind the pair, Haverkort held back Minì to complete the podium. David later lost his podium when he was penalized for misuse of the push-to-pass system. Qualifying for race two again saw Aron come out on top. He was once again strong in the race, holding the lead from Beganovic as Minì jumped from fifth to third before a red flag was thrown when Pietro Delli Guanti's car flew over the barrier at Hugenholtzbocht. Through the rest of the race, Minì passed Beganovic for second, but Aron's lead was uncontested. He completed a perfect weekend, his two wins earned him second in the standings and cut Beganovic's lead down to 36 points.

Second half 
Next, the series travelled to the Hungaroring, where Haverkort picked up his maiden pole position in first qualifying. He controlled the start, as Aron in second got overtaken by Minì, before he got pushed off by Dufek and fell down the order. Dufek was then passed himself by Roman Bilinski and Leonardo Fornaroli. This order then settled down and remained the same until the end, earning Haverkort his maiden win in the series. Race two began with David on pole alongside Minì, with the Italian getting overtaken by Bortoleto around turn one, who then tried to pass David for the lead, but failed. This order remained until Joshua Dürksen crashed, bringing out a safety car and setting the field up for a late restart. This was where Minì quickly passed Bortoleto for second before the safety car was called again and the race ended behind it. Beganovic had a rare off-day, qualifying twelfth, then having a troubled race and finishing 16th. This coupled with two second places for Minì meant his lead was slashed to only nine points.

Spa-Francorchamps played host to round six of the championship, and Beganovic was back on form, taking pole for race one. He held off pressure from Minì in second at the start, and had no pressure from then on. Shortly before the end, Minì had a puncture that ended his race. He would have lost his second place, were it not for a timely red flag called two laps later, with the results declared from lap 12 and Minì in second. Third was Meguetounif, fighting with Aron all race. After the race, Minì was disqualified on technical grounds, promoting Eduardo Barrichello to his maiden podium. Race two saw Aron on pole, before getting passed by David, Bortoleto and Beganovic. David was first over the line, but the stewards judged his pass for the lead to be made under yellow flags, handing him a penalty and thereby giving Bortoleto the win. A win and a podium meant Beganovic could overturn his recent negative trend and grow his points margin to 23 ahead of Minì. The rookie standings were now led by Fornaroli.

After the summer break, racing returned at Spielberg with Aron on pole for race one. Heavy rain disrupted the race start and caused a stoppage. On the restart, many drivers, including the lead group, soon pitted for dry tires. This left Barrichello in the lead, before getting passed by returnee Pierre-Louis Chovet, while Haverkort had moved up from 12th on the grid to second. A safety car was then brought out when Aron and Montoya collided after pitting. While slick tires initially were faster than rain tires, returning rain meant the advantage of the dry tires was gone. On the restart Haverkort and Dufek went past Chovet to finish first and second. The second race also was not very straightforward, disrupted by three safety car periods. David was still able to keep his competition behind, leading from pole until the end and leaving Beganovic and Dufek to fight each other behind, the pair eventually finishing in that same order. Two podiums for Beganovic to none for Minì meant the Swede built up his points gap to 53.

The penultimate round of the season was held at Barcelona, and Aron was once again on pole for the first race. He held off Dilano van 't Hoff at the start, who had to defend from Barrichello and David. Over the race, David was able to dispatch third and second place and began closing in on Aron. Through the last three laps, Aron repeatedly came under attack from David, but was able to keep the frenchman behind and win the race. Qualifying for race two saw Bortoleto grab his maiden pole. David started third and was able to get by Chovet straight away, but his attempt to gain the race lead was interrupted by the safety car being called. On the restart, Bortoleto initially gapped David, but the latter managed to close the gap again, with the pair fighting for a few laps until another safety car was called late in the race and the race ended under yellow flag conditions. Beganovic had a mediocre weekend, with only one points finish, so his gap to Minì dropped to 38 points, leaving the championship to be decided at Mugello.

The championship decider at Mugello began with Aron on pole for race one and Beganovic needing at least fourth place to seal the title. Aron ran a flawless lights-to-flag race to get maximum points, but was not able to deny Beganovic his championship. The Swede started third and drove with his championship in mind, not attacking Victor Bernier in second all too aggressively. He held on to fourth after Dufek passed him on a late safety car restart, thereby clinching his first single-seater title. Bortoleto was on pole for the final race of the season. Minì started third and had to win with Aron not scoring to secure second in the championship. He dispatched Dufek right at the start and gained the lead after the first third of the race. From then on, he controlled the race, while Aron started 16th and came home pointless, ceding second in the standings to Minì by a single point. Dufek in fourth was on course to win the rookie title, before an error on a safety car restart saw him drop to seventh, giving Fornaroli in eighth the title.

Beganovic's consistency was the key for his championship, only failing to score points on three occasions, as well as his very strong start to the season that saw him finish in the top two for the first seven races in a row. Minì and Aron both had stretches where they seemed able to close up to Beganovic, but his early advantage meant he led the standings from the first race until the end. In the fight for the rookie title, Montoya had the strongest start, but a run of eight pointless races in the end saw him drop to third. Entry numbers never dropped below 35, showing continually high interest in the championship. The introduction of a push-to-pass system proved to better competition, although still held back somewhat by the heavy Tatuus chassis.

Championship standings 

 Points system

Points were awarded to the top 10 classified finishers.

Drivers' standings

Teams' standings 
For teams entering more than two cars only the two best-finishing cars were eligible to score points in the teams' championship.

Notes

References

External links
 
 ACI Sport page

Formula Regional European Championship seasons
FREC
FREC